Edward Isadore Glick (April 23, 1900 – August 13, 1976) was a professional American football back in the National Football League. He played one season for the Green Bay Packers (1922). He played at the collegiate level at Lawrence University and Marquette University.

See also
Green Bay Packers players

References

1900 births
1976 deaths
American football fullbacks
American football halfbacks
American football quarterbacks
Green Bay Packers players
Lawrence Vikings football players
Marquette Golden Avalanche football players
People from Marinette, Wisconsin
Players of American football from Wisconsin